The XY sex-determination system is a sex-determination system used to classify many mammals, including humans, some insects (Drosophila), some snakes, some fish (guppies), and some plants (Ginkgo tree). In this system, the sex of an individual is determined by a pair of sex chromosomes. In most cases, females have two of the same kind of sex chromosome (XX), and are called the homogametic sex. Males have two different kinds of sex chromosomes (XY), and are called the heterogametic sex.

In humans, the presence of the Y chromosome is responsible for triggering male development; in the absence of the Y chromosome, the fetus will undergo female development. There are various exceptions, such as individuals with Klinefelter syndrome (who have XXY chromosomes), Swyer syndrome (women with XY chromosomes), and XX male syndrome (men with XX chromosomes), however these exceptions are rare. In some instances, a seemingly normal female with a vagina, cervix, and ovaries has XY chromosomes, but the SRY gene has been shut down. In most species with XY sex determination, an organism must have at least one X chromosome in order to survive.

The XY system contrasts in several ways with the ZW sex-determination system found in birds, some insects, many reptiles, and various other animals, in which the heterogametic sex is female. It had been thought for several decades that in all snakes sex was determined by the ZW system, but there had been observations of unexpected effects in the genetics of species in the families Boidae and Pythonidae; for example, parthenogenic reproduction produced only females rather than males, which is the opposite of what is to be expected in the ZW system. In the early years of the 21st century such observations prompted research that demonstrated that all pythons and boas so far investigated definitely have the XY system of sex determination.

A temperature-dependent sex determination system is found in some reptiles and fish.

Mechanisms 
All animals have a set of DNA coding for genes present on chromosomes. In humans, most mammals, and some other species, two of the chromosomes, called the X chromosome and Y chromosome, code for sex. In these species, one or more genes are present on their Y chromosome that determine maleness. In this process, an X chromosome and a Y chromosome act to determine the sex of offspring, often due to genes located on the Y chromosome that code for maleness. Offspring have two sex chromosomes: an offspring with two X chromosomes will develop female characteristics, and an offspring with an X and a Y chromosome will develop male characteristics.

Mammals 
In most mammals, sex is determined by presence of the Y chromosome. This makes individuals with XXY and XYY karyotypes males, and individuals with X and XXX karyotypes females.

In the 1930s, Alfred Jost determined that the presence of testosterone was required for Wolffian duct development in the male rabbit.

SRY is a sex-determining gene on the Y chromosome in the therians (placental mammals and marsupials). Non-human mammals use several genes on the Y chromosome.

Not all male-specific genes are located on the Y chromosome. Platypus, a monotreme, use five pairs of different XY chromosomes with six groups of male-linked genes, AMH being the master switch.

Humans

A single gene (SRY) present on the Y chromosome acts as a signal to set the developmental pathway towards maleness. Presence of this gene starts off the process of virilization. This and other factors result in the sex differences in humans. The cells in females, with two X chromosomes, undergo X-inactivation, in which one of the two X chromosomes is inactivated. The inactivated X chromosome remains within a cell as a Barr body.

Other animals
Some species of turtles have convergently evolved XY sex determination systems, specifically those in Chelidae and Staurotypinae.

Other species (including most Drosophila species) use the presence of two X chromosomes to determine femaleness: one X chromosome gives putative maleness, but the presence of Y chromosome genes is required for normal male development. In the fruit fly individuals with XY are male and individuals with XX are female; however, individuals with XXY or XXX can also be female, and individuals with X can be males.

Plants 

Very few dioecious angiosperm species have XY sex determination, such as the Silene latifolia. In these species sex determination is similar to mammals where male is XY and female is XX.

Other systems

Whilst XY sex determination is the most familiar, since it is the system that humans use, there are a range of alternative systems found in nature. The inverse of the XY system (called ZW to distinguish it) is used in birds and many insects, in which it is the females that are heterogametic (ZW), while males are homogametic (ZZ). 

Many insects of the order Hymenoptera instead have a haplo-diploid system, where the females are full diploids (with all chromosomes appearing in pairs) but males are haploid (having just one copy of all chromosomes). Some other insects have the X0 sex-determination system, where just the sex-determining chromosome vairies in ploidy (XX in females but X in males), while all other chromosomes appear in pairs in both sexes.

Influences

Genetic

In an interview for the Rediscovering Biology website, researcher Eric Vilain described how the paradigm changed since the discovery of the SRY gene:

In a 2007 interview on Scientific American Eric Vilian when he was asked "It sounds as if you are describing a shift from the prevailing view that female development is a default molecular pathway to active pro-male and antimale pathways. Are there also pro-female and antifemale pathways?" He responded with

In mammals, including humans, the SRY gene is responsible with triggering the development of non-differentiated gonads into testes, rather than ovaries. However, there are cases in which testes can develop in the absence of an SRY gene (see sex reversal). In these cases, the SOX9 gene, involved in the development of testes, can induce their development without the aid of SRY. In the absence of SRY and SOX9, no testes can develop and the path is clear for the development of ovaries. Even so, the absence of the SRY gene or the silencing of the SOX9 gene are not enough to trigger sexual differentiation of a fetus in the female direction. A recent finding suggests that ovary development and maintenance is an active process, regulated by the expression of a "pro-female" gene, FOXL2. In an interview for the TimesOnline edition, study co-author Robin Lovell-Badge explained the significance of the discovery:

Implications 
Looking into the genetic determinants of human sex can have wide-ranging consequences. Scientists have been studying different sex determination systems in fruit flies and animal models to attempt an understanding of how the genetics of sexual differentiation can influence biological processes like reproduction, ageing and disease.

Maternal
In humans and many other species of animals, the father determines the sex of the child. In the XY sex-determination system, the female-provided ovum contributes an X chromosome and the male-provided sperm contributes either an X chromosome or a Y chromosome, resulting in female (XX) or male (XY) offspring, respectively.

Hormone levels in the male parent affect the sex ratio of sperm in humans. Maternal influences also impact which sperm are more likely to achieve conception.

Human ova, like those of other mammals, are covered with a thick translucent layer called the zona pellucida, which the sperm must penetrate to fertilize the egg. Once viewed simply as an impediment to fertilization, recent research indicates the zona pellucida may instead function as a sophisticated biological security system that chemically controls the entry of the sperm into the egg and protects the fertilized egg from additional sperm.

Recent research indicates that human ova may produce a chemical which appears to attract sperm and influence their swimming motion. However, not all sperm are positively impacted; some appear to remain uninfluenced and some actually move away from the egg.

Maternal influences may also be possible that affect sex determination in such a way as to produce fraternal twins equally weighted between one male and one female.

The time at which insemination occurs during the estrus cycle has been found to affect the sex ratio of the offspring of humans, cattle, hamsters, and other mammals. Hormonal and pH conditions within the female reproductive tract vary with time, and this affects the sex ratio of the sperm that reach the egg.

Sex-specific mortality of embryos also occurs.

History

Ancient ideas on sex determination 
Aristotle believed incorrectly that the sex of an infant is determined by how much heat a man's sperm had during insemination. He wrote:

Aristotle claimed in error that the male principle was the driver behind sex determination, such that if the male principle was insufficiently expressed during reproduction, the fetus would develop as a female.

20th century genetics 
Nettie Stevens (working with beetles) and Edmund Beecher Wilson (working with hemiptera) are credited with independently discovering, in 1905, the chromosomal XY sex-determination system in insects: the fact that males have XY sex chromosomes and females have XX sex chromosomes. In the early 1920s, Theophilus Painter demonstrated that sex in humans (and other mammals) was also determined by the X and Y chromosomes, and the chromosomes that make this determination are carried by the spermatozoa.

The first clues to the existence of a factor that determines the development of testis in mammals came from experiments carried out by Alfred Jost, who castrated embryonic rabbits in utero and noticed that they all developed as female.

In 1959, C. E. Ford and his team, in the wake of Jost's experiments, discovered that the Y chromosome was needed for a fetus to develop as male when they examined patients with Turner's syndrome, who grew up as phenotypic females, and found them to be X0 (hemizygous for X and no Y). At the same time, Jacob & Strong described a case of a patient with Klinefelter syndrome (XXY), which implicated the presence of a Y chromosome in development of maleness.

All these observations led to a consensus that a dominant gene that determines testis development (TDF) must exist on the human Y chromosome. The search for this testis-determining factor (TDF) led a team of scientists in 1990 to discover a region of the Y chromosome that is necessary for the male sex determination, which was named SRY (sex-determining region of the Y chromosome).

See also 
 Sexual differentiation (human)
 Secondary sex characteristic (human)
 Y-chromosomal Adam
 Sex Determination in Silene
 Sex-determination system
 Sexual differentiation
 Haplodiploid sex-determination system
 Z0 sex-determination system

 ZW sex-determination system
 Temperature-dependent sex determination
 X chromosome
 Y chromosome

References

External links 
 Sex Determination and Differentiation
 SRY: Sex determination from the National Center for Biotechnology Information
 Can Mammalian Mothers Control the Sex of their Offspring? (KQED Science article on San Diego Zoo research.)
 Maternal Diet and Other Factors Affecting Offspring Sex Ratio: A Review, published in Biology of Reproduction
 Sex Determination and the Maternal Dominance Hypothesis
 Sperm-Ovum Interactions at WikiGenes

Sex-determination systems
Reproduction in mammals